

Denmark
South Greenland – Carl Peter Holbøll, Inspector of South Greenland (1828–1856)

Portugal
Angola
 Manuel Bernardo Vidal, Governor-General of Angola (1837–1839)
 António Manuel de Noronha, Governor-General of Angola (1839)
 Manuel Eleutério Malheiro, Governor-General of Angola (1839–1842)

United Kingdom
 Malta Colony – Henry Bouverie, Governor of Malta (1836–1843)
 New South Wales – Major George Gipps, Governor of New South Wales (1838–1846)
 South Australia – Lieutenant-Colonel George Gawler, Governor of South Australia (1838–1841)
 Western Australia 
 Captain James Stirling, Governor of Western Australia (1828–1839)
 John Hutt, Governor of Western Australia (1839–1846)

Colonial governors
Colonial governors
1839